The 2019 Campeonato Nacional, known as Campeonato AFP PlanVital 2019 for sponsorship reasons, was the 89th season of top-flight football in Chile. The season started on 15 February 2019. Universidad Católica were the defending champions, having won the previous tournament.

Due to the 2019 Chilean protests, the competition was suspended since mid-October with six matchdays still left. After a failed attempt to resume normal activity that saw only one match fully played, on 29 November 2019, ANFP's Council of Presidents voted to conclude the season. Thus Universidad Católica, who were leading the competition at the time of the suspension, won their fourteenth title. No teams were relegated to the Primera B this season.

Teams

Sixteen teams took part in the league in this season: the top fourteen teams from the previous season, plus Coquimbo Unido and Cobresal, who were promoted from the Primera B. Both promoted teams replaced Deportes Temuco and San Luis, who were relegated at the end of the last season.

Stadia and locations

Personnel and kits

Managerial changes

Standings

Results

Top goalscorers
{| class="wikitable" border="1"
|-
! Rank
! Name
! Club
! Goals
|-
| align=center | 1
| Lucas Passerini
|Palestino
| align=center | 14
|-
| rowspan=2 align=center | 2
| Tobías Figueroa
|Deportes Antofagasta
| rowspan=2 align=center | 11
|-
| Ignacio Jeraldino
|Audax Italiano
|-
| rowspan=2 align=center | 4
| Matías Donoso
|Deportes Iquique
| rowspan=2 align=center | 10
|-
| Roberto Gutiérrez
|Palestino
|-
| align=center | 6
| José Pedro Fuenzalida
|Universidad Católica
| align=center | 9
|-
| rowspan=3 align=center | 7
| Carlos Muñoz
|Cobresal
| rowspan=3 align=center | 8
|-
| Mauro Quiroga
|Curicó Unido
|-
| Sebastián Varas
|Unión Española
|-
| rowspan=3 align=center | 10
| Leandro Benegas
|Universidad de Chile
| rowspan=3 align=center | 7
|-
| Iván Ledezma
|Audax Italiano
|-
| Juan Sánchez Sotelo
|Huachipato
|}

Source: Soccerway

References

External links
ANFP 

Chile
2019 in Chilean sport
Primera División de Chile seasons
2019 in Chilean football